Krini (Greek: Κρήνη meaning "source", before 1955: Βοστίδι - Vostidi) is a village in the municipal unit of Oichalia in the southeastern part of the Trikala regional unit, Greece. It is situated on the edge of the Thessalian Plain, 6 km northwest of Farkadona. Krini had a population of 733 in 2011.

Population

External links
 Krini on GTP Travel Pages

See also

List of settlements in the Trikala regional unit

References

Populated places in Trikala (regional unit)